Ivan Čupić (born 27 March 1986) is a Croatian handball player who plays for RK Zagreb and the Croatian national team.

Career
He was selected by the Croatian national team for the 2009 World Men's Handball Championship. He scored 8 goals in the opening match against South Korea, settling as the top scorer after the first day.  He also played in the Croatian team that won the bronze medal at the 2012 Summer Olympics.

Čupić missed the Games of XXIX Olympiad in Beijing, after losing his left ring finger in bizarre accident in July 2008. During a training session, Čupić fell and caught his wedding ring on a wire fence. The force of the fall severed his finger at the first joint. Though the amputated portion of the digit could not be reattached, his career has since been unaffected by having only nine fingers.

Honours
Gorenje
Slovenian First League: 2008-09
Slovenian Super Cup: 2009

Vive Targi Kielce
EHF Champions League: 2015–16
Polish Championship: 2013, 2014, 2015, 2016
Polish Cup:2013, 2014, 2015, 2016
RK Vardar
Macedonian Super League: 2017, 2018, 2019, 2021
Macedonian Cup: 2017, 2018, 2021
Macedonian Super Cup: 2017, 2018, 2019
EHF Champions League: 2016–17, 2018–19
SEHA League: 2016-17, 2017-18, 2018-19

References

1986 births
Living people
Croatian male handball players
Sportspeople from Metković
Rhein-Neckar Löwen players
RK Medveščak Zagreb players
Vive Kielce players
Handball-Bundesliga players
Handball players at the 2012 Summer Olympics
Handball players at the 2016 Summer Olympics
Olympic handball players of Croatia
Olympic bronze medalists for Croatia
Olympic medalists in handball
Medalists at the 2012 Summer Olympics
Sportspeople with limb difference
Croatian amputees
Expatriate handball players in Poland
Croatian expatriate sportspeople in Germany
Croatian expatriate sportspeople in Poland
Croatian expatriate sportspeople in Slovenia
Croatian expatriate sportspeople in Spain
Croatian expatriate sportspeople in North Macedonia
Mediterranean Games silver medalists for Croatia
Competitors at the 2005 Mediterranean Games
Mediterranean Games medalists in handball